Trustco, or TrustCo, may refer to:
 Trustco Bank, a bank in the United States
 Trustco Bank Namibia, a microfinance bank in Namibia
 Trustco Group Holdings, a JSE Limited-listed Namibian company